Africa Finance Corporation (AFC) is a pan-African Multilateral  Development Financial Institution established in 2007  by sovereign African states to  provide pragmatic solutions  to Africa's infrastructure deficit and challenging operating environment.  The Corporation bridges the infrastructure investment gap through the provision of debt and equity finance, project development, technical and financial advisory services. 

AFC's investment remit is pan- African, focusing on investment across makes investments across five key sectors; Power, Transport and Logistics, Natural Resources, Telecommunications and Heavy industries. 

AFC is majority owned by private investors the bulk of which are African financial institutions, Private investors own 55.3% of the corporation. A further 44.7% is owned by the Central Bank of Nigeria. In addition to private investors owning shares, AFC’s allows African states (through their respective central banks, sovereign wealth funds, state pension funds or similar institutions) to be both shareholders and members of the corporation. As of April 2020, AFC has twenty six (26)  member states. They are Nigeria (host country), Benin, Cape Verde, Chad, Côte d'Ivoire, Djibouti, Eritrea, Gabon, Gambia, Ghana, Guinea, Guinea Bissau, Kenya, Liberia, Madagascar, Malawi, Mauritius, Rwanda, Sierra Leone, Togo, Uganda, Zambia and Zimbabwe.

Africa Finance Corporation, to date, has invested over US$ 6.6 billion in infrastructure projects, across 28 African countries.

History

Early projects

Africa Finance Corporation (AFC) was launched in December, 2007 by the founding President and Chief Executive Mr Austine Ometoruwa, then Citibank Africa Investment Bank Head and by the founding Chairman Chukwuma Soludo, then governor of the Central Bank of Nigeria (CBN), with US$2 billion of authorised share capital.

In June, 2009 AFC agreed an equity financing deal with a consortium of investors in the US$240 million Main One Cable System, a 7,000 km submarine fibre-optic cable connecting West Africa to Europe.

By July 2009, it was reported by Reuters that AFC had US$180 million invested in oil and gas, telecoms, transport and airline projects – mainly in Nigeria.

In September 2011, the corporation partnered with the African Export-Import Bank (Afreximbank) and Banque Internationale pour l' Afrique Occidentale - Côte d'Ivoire (BIAO-CI) in a US$320 million trade finance facility to finance the importation, processing and refining of crude oil by Societe Ivoirienne de Raffinage (SIR).

Power generation

In June 2013, AFC announced its support for privatisation of the Nigerian power sector, providing a US$215 million debt financing facility for the acquisition of the Ughelli Power plc by Transcorp.
The previous month it had joined Lagos-based Vigeo and India’s Tata Power in a consortium which successfully bid US$129 million for Benin Distribution Company. In August 2013, AFC provided a US$170 million loan facility to Nigerian firm Mainstream Energy Solutions Limited (MESL) in its successful bid for the 1,338 MW Kainji Hydroelectric power plant in Niger State, Nigeria.

At the same time it was invited to become a private sector partner in the US $7 billion USAID-funded ‘Power Africa’ initiative announced by US President Obama in Cape Town. AFC has since invested US$250 million and leveraged an additional US$1billion of investments in the power sectors of Ghana, Kenya and Nigeria.

In December 2014, AFC took a 23.2% stake in Mozambican power developer Ncondezi Energy.

Also in December 2014, AFC became the largest investor and lead developer in the US$900 million Kpone Independent Power Project (Kpone IPP) in Ghana, which comprises a 350MW gas turbine, a substation and fuel storage.

In July 2015, the corporation signed a joint development agreement with the Ivorian project company Ivoire Hydro Energy SA (IHE) to build a 44MW hydroelectric power plant in Singrobo, Côte d'Ivoire.

In June 2016, AFC and institutional investor Harith General Partners merged their power sector assets to form a new entity combining renewable and non-renewable power generating assets in Africa.

Financing

AFC signed its first loan – a US$50 million bilateral deal with Standard Bank – in July 2011.
The following year the African Development Bank (AfDB) approved a US$200 million line of credit to AFC with the mandate to catalyse investments and help bridge Africa’s infrastructure gap.

In October 2013, AFC launched its first syndicated loan – a US$250 million deal with Citibank, Rand Merchant Bank, Standard Bank, and Standard Chartered Bank – to finance trade projects.

In June 2016, AFC borrowed US$150 million for 15 years from KfW, for onward lending in the sectors of power, telecommunications, transport and heavy industry

Projects

Power
Cen Power Kpone IPP in Ghana
Cabeolica Wind farm in Cape Verde
450MW IPP In Republic of Benin
350MW IPP in Ghana
300MW IPP in Mozambique
Technical Adviser to the Central Bank of Nigeria on its US$2 billion Power and Aviation Intervention *Fund (PAIF)
AFC/Harith Merger
Singrobo Hydro Power Plant
Kenya Power & Lighting Company

Transport & Logistics
Henri Konan Bedie Bridge in Côte d'Ivoire 
Ethiopian Airline Expansion
Bakwena Toll Road in South Africa 
Ghana Airport Company
Port d’ Abidjan
Financial Adviser to Nigeria Sovereign Investment Authority (NSIA) on the Second Niger Bridge
Olam Gabon Special Economic Zone (GSEZ)

Heavy Industries
ARM Cement (Formerly Athi River Mining Limited)

Telecommunications
Main One cable system 
SAIF acquisition, South Africa

Natural Resources
Seven Energy
Megadrill Services Limited
Société Nationale des Pétroles du Congo, Republic of Congo
Bonny Gas Transport
Glencore/Société des Hydrocarbures du Tchad  
Vivo Energy
Shalina Resources Limited
New Age (African Global Energy)
Alufer Mining Limited 
Carbon Holdings Limited 
Aker Energy offshore project 
Brahms Oil Refineries Limited 
Eritrean Collui Potash

References

International organizations based in Africa
International development in Africa
Economy of Africa
Development finance institutions
Financial services companies established in 2007
Companies based in Lagos
Nigerian companies established in 2007